Edelbrock, LLC is an American manufacturer of specialty automotive and motorcycle parts. The company is headquartered in Olive Branch, Mississippi, with a Southern California R&D Tech Center located in Cerritos, CA. The Edelbrock Sand Cast and Permanent Mold Manufacturing foundries are located in San Jacinto, CA. Edelbrock has two facilities in North Carolina: the Edelbrock Carburetor Division in Sanford, and the Edelbrock Race Center in Mooresville.

Vic Edelbrock founded the corporation in 1938 when his desire to increase the performance of his 1932 Ford Roadster led him to design a new intake manifold, friends and fellow drivers soon wanted one as well. This transformed his repair garage into a parts manufacturing enterprise, making one-of-a-kind equipment for automobiles.

History

Origins

Vic Edelbrock Sr. was born in a small farming community of Eudora, Kansas in 1913. After the family grocery store burned down in 1927, he left school at the age of 14 to help support the family by ferrying Model T Fords from Wichita to the many outlying farms in the area. The frequent stops to replace parts that shook loose on the region's dirt roads made him an expert at impromptu repair work. Soon after, he found work in a local repair shop, working as an auto mechanic.

When the Great Depression hit in 1931, Edelbrock went to California to live with his brother, Carl. Initially, he moved in with his brother and took a job as an auto mechanic. In order to earn some extra money to open his own repair shop, Edelbrock took an evening job in downtown Los Angeles parking cars at a large apartment complex. It was a chance encounter at this parking complex where he bumped into the 19-year-old Irish woman, Katherine (Katie) Collins, who was working as a day maid. Despite the fact that Katie was engaged, Edelbrock convinced her to give him a chance and not marry her fiancé. Vic and Katie married in June 1933, just eight weeks after meeting.

As a 22-year-old, Edelbrock teamed up with his new brother-in-law to open his first automobile repair shop on Wilshire Boulevard in Beverly Hills. Business flourished and in 1934 Edelbrock moved into his own shop on the corner of Venice Blvd and Hoover in Los Angeles. Business continued to grow rapidly and he moved his shop three more times in the 1930s. In 1936, Katie Edelbrock gave birth to Vic, Jr., the couple's only child.

The Slingshot

In 1938 Vic Edelbrock bought his first project car, a 1932 Ford Roadster. In his desire to increase the performance, he joined with Tommy Thickstun to design a new intake manifold for the roadster's flathead engine. Unhappy with the performance of that manifold, Edelbrock designed his own, nicknamed The Slingshot. Most importantly, the new manifold allowed two Stromberg 97 carburetors to be used, eliminating a bottleneck that limited the engine's horsepower. The manifold was tested for quality at the Muroc dry lake (occupied today by Edwards Air Force Base), which was a testing ground for Edelbrock and many other car clubs and racing associations. Originally, he had no intention of producing any additional manifolds, but the overwhelming response following his phenomenal speed in a 1932 Ford prompted Edelbrock to make more. This was the first product that he sold commercially and marked the beginning of the company as it is known today. Edelbrock ultimately manufactured 100 of the Slingshot manifolds.

Early years
During World War II, Edelbrock's machinist skills were put to work in the Todd Shipyards in Long Beach, hand fabricating and welding aircraft parts. The Office of Defense Transportation placed a ban on auto racing during the war, but Edelbrock discreetly designed and developed a new line of products. After the war, he produced aluminum racing cylinder heads, in addition to manifolds, which quickly gained him notability among hot rodding hobbyists. Parts to increase an engine's performance were not readily available, so racers built their own. Soon Edelbrock found himself building pieces first for his friends and then for customers.

To deal with the enormous amount of mail he was receiving by 1946 Edelbrock created the company's first catalog, Edelbrock Power and Speed Equipment, with the help of Robert E. "Pete" Petersen. This hastened the transformation of the Edelbrock company from a repair garage into a performance parts manufacturer. Then, in 1947, Edelbrock produced the first cylinder heads for the Ford flathead.

One of the first companies to use an engine dynamometer, Edelbrock moved to a 5,000 sq ft shop in 1949 to develop more manifolds, cylinder heads and racing pistons. In the early 1950s, he continued to dominate the dry lakes and expanded his racing to the Bonneville Speedway.

Racing
After the war, the California Roadster Association (CRA) was formed to run auto races with roadsters that raced on oval track and attempted land speed records on dry lakes. After World War II, the CRA began sanctioning sprint car races. In 1946, Edelbrock decided to expand his involvement into midget car racing, purchasing a car made by Frank Kurtis. In addition to racing the car, he wanted a test bench for the racing products he was developing. Edelbrock's team toured the dirt track racing circuit of Southern California with flathead guru Bobby Meeks tuning the cars. Many famous drivers were part of the Edelbrock team, including Walt Faulkner (first rookie to win pole at the Indy 500), Bill Vukovich (Indy 500 winner in ’53 and ’54), Rodger Ward (Indy 500 winner in ’59 and ’62), Cal Niday, Perry Grimm, Danny Oakes, Harry Stockman and Bill Zaring.

A major claim to fame for Edelbrock was beating all the Offenhauser-powered midget cars that had dominated midget car racing for several years; a remarkable feat because Offenhausers had a significant power advantage over all the other engines. Using his Kurtis Kraft V8-60 "shaker" midget car powered by a secret blend of 20% nitromethane (disguised with the scent of orange oil), Rodger Ward made history on August 10, 1950, when his Edelbrock-powered #27 car broke the winning streak of the "Offy"-equipped midget cars at Gilmore Stadium, the track that originated midget car racing. This was the only V8-60 to ever beat the Offys in the Gilmore 386-Race history. The same car raced at the Orange Show Stadium in San Bernardino the following night, again beating the Offenhauser cars. This feat was never duplicated in the history of midget racing. Edelbrock was not the only racer in that era to experiment with nitromethane; fellow racers Joaquin Arnett and Tony Capanna had tried it in their hot rods, as well. Edelbrock, however, is generally considered to be the one who pulled it all together and made the volatile fuel work.

Turning points

Until 1955, Edelbrock made parts only for Ford, Mercury and Lincoln. Few things affected the company (as well as the development of the hot rod market) more than the development of the Chevrolet small-block engine (also known as the Gen I) in 1955. Chevrolet delivered three Gen I engines to Edelbrock for experimentation. He used one engine for testing on a dynamometer and another to test multi-carb manifolds for magazine articles. He prepared the third engine for boat builder Henry Lauterback, who immediately set two world records in Miami, Florida.

In 1958, Edelbrock managed an industry first by extracting one horsepower per cubic-inch from a 283 cid small-block Chevy that was equipped with his newly designed Cross Ram Manifold. This breakthrough led him to begin producing manifolds for Pontiac and Chrysler engines.

Another critical turning point in the company's history was the 1964 decision to build a four-barrel intake manifold for the small-block Chevrolet. The C-4B manifold, developed with help from Bob Joehnck, opened the door to a new line of performance products. Although competing with the factory was a risky proposition, it turned out to be a beneficial one, as it allowed the company to expand into a new market.

Growth

In 1962, cancer claimed the life of Victor Edelbrock, Sr. at the age of 49. At the time, the company consisted of ten employees and annual sales were $450,000. Edelbrock was succeeded by his only son, 26-year-old Vic Edelbrock, Jr. Vic Jr., who had graduated with a degree in business from USC in 1958, became president and chief executive officer, a position he held until 2010.

The company joined SEMA (the Specialty Equipment Market Association) as a charter member in the 1960s, with Vic Edelbrock, Jr. serving as president from 1971 to 1974. Edelbrock had been elected in a crucial time in the history of SEMA; Congress enacted the Clean Air Act in 1971 and established the Environmental Protection Agency, which targeted the air pollution caused by internal combustion engines.

When gas prices soared in the 1970s, Edelbrock produced its Streetmaster line of intake manifolds that featured improved mileage, as well as performance.

In 1987, Edelbrock moved its facilities to its current location in Torrance, California. In 1990, Edelbrock built a  sand-cast aluminum foundry in San Jacinto, which employed 75 to 100 workers, and gave the company the ability to increase production according to market demands.

In 1994, the Edelbrock corporation went public, selling shares of stock on the NASDAQ stock exchange. This initially raised $21 million, which was used mainly for construction of a new exhaust division in Torrance near its main facilities.

In 2000, Russell Performance Plumbing, a company that manufactures fittings and hoses, was acquired by Edelbrock. The company, which had been based in Florida, was relocated to Torrance by 2001.

As of June 30, 2004, the company employed 722 persons, and achieved revenues of $125.98 million USD. Since the company went private again in 2004, revenue findings have not been available to the general public.

On June 7, 2010, the Chicago-based private equity firm Industrial Opportunity Partners (IOP) acquired Edelbrock Corporation.

In January 2021, the company was announced that its headquarters would be relocated to Mississippi.

Modern-day racing

The Edelbrock logo is prevalent in NASCAR but the company does not sponsor a racing team. Instead it engages in advertising through a $250,000 per year (2004) contract with NASCAR by which the Edelbrock contingency sticker is placed on every NASCAR race car. Contingency is a common form of "after the fact" sponsorship whereby racers place stickers on their vehicles from companies that post monetary awards to racing teams for winning, in exchange for the right to use images of winning drivers and their cars in promotional literature and advertising.

Edelbrock also posts contingency awards for drag racers, including NHRA sportsman categories. Since 2002, Edelbrock has been the title sponsor of the PRO Edelbrock Drag Racing Series, which features both professional and sportsman racing classes. The racing series includes seven classes of heads-up style racing and three classes of index style racing.

In 2021, Edelbrock partnered with Ilmor to build engines for the Superstar Racing Experience. Using the Ilmor 396 as a base, Edelbrock provides components such as the camshaft and ignition coils.

Products
Eighty years after Vic Edelbrock Sr. manufactured the first Flathead Ford intake manifold, the Edelbrock company now designs and manufactures camshaft and lifter kits, carburetors, crate engines, cylinder heads, electronic fuel injection, engine blocks, engine dress-up, fuel pumps, intake manifolds, nitrous oxide injection, power packages, superchargers, top end kits, valvetrain, and water pumps. The company relies on online and catalog resellers along with traditional brick-and-mortar retailers. In 2018, Edelbrock launched a direct-to-consumer e-commerce website.

Timeline
 1931 – Edelbrock moves to California
 1934 – Edelbrock moves into a shop on Venice and Hoover in Los Angeles
 1938 – Edelbrock moves to the Breawood Garage in Los Angeles 
 1938 – Edelbrock buys a 1932 Ford Roadster and designs the first Edelbrock product, the Slingshot manifold
 1941 – Edelbrock sets land speed record in a V8 roadster September 28
 1941–45 – Edelbrock contributes to the WWII war effort by fabricating parts in the Long Beach shipyard
 1945 – Edelbrock designs his first aluminum racing cylinder heads for flathead Fords
 1945 – Vic Sr. purchased first building with machine shop on N. Highland in Hollywood, California
 1946 – First Edelbrock catalog published
 1948 – Edelbrock purchases a Clayton engine dynamometer
 1949 — Edelbrock moves to its first purpose-built shop called Edelbrock Equipment Co. on Jefferson Blvd. in Los Angeles
 1958 – Edelbrock is the first to achieve one horsepower per cubic inch
 1962 – Vic Edelbrock, Jr. takes control of company when Vic Sr. dies of cancer at age 49
 1963 – Edelbrock celebrates 25 Years in business
 1968 – Edelbrock moves to El Segundo, California
 1971–74 – Vic Edelbrock, Jr. elected president of SEMA
 1973 – Edelbrock becomes a major sponsor of NASCAR
 1975 – Car Craft names Edelbrock "Manufacturer of the Year"
 1984 – Edelbrock awarded PWA Manufacturer of the Year
 1986 – First Cylinder Head was produced
 1987 – Edelbrock moves to Torrance, California
 1988 – Edelbrock celebrates 50 Years in business
 1989 – Edelbrock awarded PWA Manufacturer of the Year
 1990 – Sand cast aluminum foundry built in San Jacinto, California
 1990 – Edelbrock awarded PWA Manufacturer of the Year
 1994 – Edelbrock goes public on the NASDAQ stock exchange. An exhaust division is formed.
 1995 – Edelbrock acquires Qwiksilver II and begins manufacturing Harley-Davidson motorcycle products
 1997 – Edelbrock opens a state-of-the-art Sand Cast Aluminum Foundry
 1999 – New distribution center opens, including Vic's Garage, a museum of Edelbrock's cars
 1999 – Forbes names Edelbrock as one of the 200 best small companies
 2000 – Forbes names Edelbrock as one of the 200 best small companies for the second year in a row
 2000–01 – Edelbrock acquires Russell Performance Plumbing
 2004 – Edelbrock returns to being a Private company
 2007 – Edelbrock begins construction of a Permanent Mold Aluminum foundry
 2008 – Edelbrock awarded PWA Manufacturer of the Year
 2010 – Industrial Opportunity Partners strategically invests in the Edelbrock Corporation
 2011 – Edelbrock sells its line of suspension components to QA1
 2012 – Edelbrock acquires SX Performance
 2017 – Vic Edelbrock, Jr. dies at age 80.
 2017 – Edelbrock awarded CAN (formerly PWA) Manufacturer of the Year
 2018 – Edelbrock celebrates 80 Years in business
 2018 – First Edelbrock diesel cylinder head produced
 2020 – Edelbrock opens the Edelbrock Race Center in North Carolina that will focus on race-oriented cylinder head machining
 2020 – Edelbrock and Competition Cams merge, creating a new platform company owned by Industrial Opportunity Partners
 2020 – Edelbrock divests its nitrous oxide category to Nitrous Supply
 2021 – The Edelbrock Group is formed, consisting of COMP Cams, Edelbrock, FAST Fuel Air Spark Technology, Russell Performance and TCI Automotive
 2021 – Edelbrock corporate headquarters, manufacturing and distribution center move to new 300,000-square-foot facility in Olive Branch, MS
 2021 – Edelbrock expansion includes new Southern California Tech Center located in Cerritos, CA
 2021 – Edelbrock introduces Pro-Flo 4+ EFI Engine Management System

References

Further reading

"Edelbrock Corp. Reports Record Sales and Earnings for Fiscal Fourth Quarter and Year 2000," Business Wire, September 6, 2000, p. 0054.
Fine, Howard, "Slow But Steady Growth for Auto Parts Firm Edelbrock," Los Angeles Business Journal, February 15, 1999, p. 21.
Glover, Kara, "Sales Zooming for Car-Parts Specialist," Los Angeles Business Journal, July 24, 1995, p. 1.
Schonfeld, Erick, "Erector Sets for Hog and Car Lovers," Fortune, October 30, 1995, p. 227.

External links
Edelbrock Performance LLC
Edelbrock Foundry

American companies established in 1938
Manufacturing companies established in 1938
Manufacturing companies based in Greater Los Angeles
Companies based in Torrance, California
Motorcycle technology
Auto parts suppliers of the United States
Automotive motorsports and performance companies
1938 establishments in California
Carburetor manufacturers
2010 mergers and acquisitions